Leokadija Diržinskaitė-Piliušenko (1921-2008) was a Soviet-Lithuanian Politician (Communist).

She served as Minister of Foreign Affairs in 1961–1976.

References

1921 births
20th-century Lithuanian women politicians
20th-century Lithuanian politicians
Soviet women in politics
Lithuanian communists
Women government ministers of Lithuania
2008 deaths
People's commissars and ministers of the Lithuanian Soviet Socialist Republic